Sarah Martins Da Silva  is a British gynaecologist and researcher specialising in male infertility. Da Silva is a senior lecturer in reproductive medicine at the University of Dundee. She also works as an honorary consultant gynaecologist at the Ninewells Hospital in Dundee, specialising in fertility problems and assisted conception. She was named one of the BBC's "100 Women of 2019" for her contribution to fertility science.

Early life and education 
Da Silva was born and raised near Cambridge, England. Her father was an engineer and her mother was engaged in charity work. From a young age, she aspired to become a doctor and scientist.

In 1990, Da Silva graduated from the Perse School for Girls in Cambridge. In 1995, she received a Bachelor of Medicine, Bachelor of Surgery (MBChB) from the University of Edinburgh Medical School. In 2001, Da Silva qualified with a Diploma of the Faculty of Family Planning (DFFP) from the Royal College of Obstetricians and Gynaecologists, Faculty of Sexual and Reproductive Healthcare. In 2007, Da Silva received an M.D. from University of Edinburgh Medical School where her residency was in gynecology and obstetrics. Da Silva's doctoral thesis was titled "Activin and Neurotrophin Regulation of Human Follicular Development and Bovine Oocyte Maturation" and investigated egg cell maturation and the development of the ovaries. Her advisor was Richard Anderson. In 2008 she qualified with a Diploma in Obstetric Ultrasound from Royal College of Obstetricians and Gynaecologists / Royal College of Radiologists and also received her MRCOG there.

Career
From 2000 to 2004, Da Silva was a clinical lecturer at the MRC Centre for Reproductive Health at the University of Edinburgh School of Medicine. From 2004 to 2011, Da Silva worked as a specialist registrar in the obstetrics and gynaecology division of the Royal Infirmary of Edinburgh within NHS Lothian.

From 2011 to 2013, Da Silva was a Scottish Clinical Research Excellence Development Scheme (SCREDS) specialist in reproductive medicine at the University of Dundee School of Medicine. From 2013 to 2019, Da Silva was a consultant gynaecologist and honorary senior lecturer at Ninewells Hospital at NHS Tayside in Dundee, Scotland.

In 2019, Da Silva became senior lecturer in reproductive medicine and an honorary consultant gynaecologist at the University of Dundee School of Medicine.

In addition to her work in sperm count and function, Da Silva is a consultant gynecologist in the area of freezing eggs.

In 2019, Da Silva featured in a BBC documentary on fertility issues and IVF. She delivered a speech highlighting the problem of decreasing sperm counts at the BBC 100 Women event in Delhi, India.

Research
Da Silva leads a research group on male infertility, sperm biology and drug discovery. She is the lead on a UK-wide research clinic on sperm studies for couples affected by unexplained infertility post-IVF treatment. Da Silva has published scientific papers predominantly focussing on human fertility.

Da Silva's work on male infertility was motivated by the unexplained decrease in male fertility in the late 20th and early 21st centuries. During her work as a consultant doctor for assisted conception, she noticed that treatment options for male fertility were limited, instead requiring the female partner to undergo invasive fertility treatments such as in-vitro fertilisation (IVF) and intracytoplasmic sperm injection that did not directly address the problem of low male fertility. Da Silva's research investigates the functionality of sperm cells, particularly the sperm-specific calcium channel CatSper, and how modern lifestyle choices may affect sperm function. She is working on developing drugs to enhance sperm count and function, for which she has won funding from the Bill & Melinda Gates Foundation. Da Silva helped create a high-throughput system for screening many potential drugs, an approach which led to the discovery of two compounds that were able to enhance sperm motility in laboratory tests.

Personal life 
Da Silva married fellow medical student Mauricio Martins Da Silva while studying at the University of Edinburgh. They have three children.

Membership
 Royal College of Obstetricians and Gynaecologists, Member

Honors
 2019: Glasgow Times, Scotswoman of the Year Award, finalist
 2019: BBC, 100 Women 2019

Selected works and publications

References

External links
 Sarah Martins Da Silva at University of Dundee School of Medicine

Living people
Year of birth missing (living people)
British women scientists
21st-century British medical doctors
British medical researchers
Alumni of the University of Edinburgh
Fertility medicine
People educated at the Perse School for Girls
BBC 100 Women